Harold Lilly may refer to:

 Harold Alexander Lilly (1885–1936), farmer, car dealer and political figure in Saskatchewan
 Harold Lilly (songwriter), American songwriter